The Fountain of Wealth (Malay: Air Pancut Kekayaan, Chinese: 财富之泉) is listed by the Guinness Book of Records in 1998 as the largest fountain in the world. It is located in one of Singapore's largest shopping malls, Suntec City.

During certain periods of the day, the fountain is turned off and visitors are invited to walk around a mini fountain at the centre of the fountain's base, three times for good luck. At night, the fountain is the setting for laser performances, as well as live song and laser message dedications between 8 pm to 9 pm daily. It is situated in such a way the fountain is the hub of the shopping mall.

History 

The inward flowing water of the fountain was used for two reasons. Water is known as the symbol of life and wealth in Chinese culture, and the inward motion of the water symbolises the retention of wealth for Suntec City. According to feng shui experts (Chinese geomancers), the water flowing inwards represents riches pouring in, thus the name Fountain of Wealth.

The Fountain of Wealth was constructed in 1995, together with the main Suntec City development. A symbol of wealth and life, the Fountain of Wealth is recognised since 1998 by the Guinness Book of World Records as the World's Largest Fountain.  The bronze ring of the fountain is designed based on the Hindu Mandala, meaning universe and is a symbolic representation of the oneness in spirit and unity and further symbolises the equality and harmony of all races and religions in Singapore.

Structure 

The fountain is made of silicon bronze, and consists of a circular ring with a circumference of 66 meters supported on four large slanted columns. It occupies an area of 1683.07 square metres, with a height of 13.8m.
The sand-cast silicon bronze, including all formwork and patternmaking, was designed, manufactured, and installed by DCG Design and Meridian Projects (from Melbourne Australia) in 1995.
The base area of the fountain is 1683 square meters. In the design plan of Suntec City, where the five tower blocks represent the fingers and thumb of a left hand emerging from the ground, the fountain forms the palm of the hand.

Apart from the jets of water cascading down from the ring, the center of the fountain also boasts a medium-sized water screen, used for the nightly laser shows, as well as a large jet of water which is occasionally turned on, and spouts higher than the top of the ring.

The fountain was upgraded by OASE Living Water and involved the removal of the water screen, projectors, and lasers from the fountain. The path to the center of the fountain was also relocated and rebuilt. Laminar Jets (OASE Jumping Jet Rainbow Star) are installed in one ring at the edges of the fountain, while Varionaut pumps drive water jets circling around the center fountain, which has received new LED light fixtures.

Location 
The base of the fountain is located underground, and on its base perimeter lies the main basement restaurant area of Suntec City. The circular ring top of the fountain is visible at ground level.

In popular culture 
 When The Amazing Race 3, a reality television show, came to Singapore in 2002, contestants collected a clue at the fountain.
Similarly, contestants of The Amazing Race Asia 1 also went to the fountain for a clue.
 In the Indian superhero film, Krrish, when Krrish used it as an observation point to locate the position of his Nemesis's helicopter that he is chasing.
 Magician, Cyril Takayama, performed some tricks on the fountain on the first episode of "Cyril : Simply Magic", which was broadcast on AXN Asia, and MediaCorp Channel 5.

See also
Suntec Singapore International Convention and Exhibition Centre

References

External links 

Fountain of Wealth at Suntec City
SUNTEC Fountain of Wealth Live – Using Axis P3364 and NetRex CamStreamer

Downtown Core (Singapore)
Fountains in Singapore
Marina Centre
Tourist attractions in Singapore